The 2016 Dutch Darts Masters was the first of ten PDC European Tour events on the 2016 PDC Pro Tour. The tournament took place at the Evenementenhal, Venray, Netherlands, between 12–14 February 2016. It featured a field of 48 players and £115,000 in prize money, with £25,000 going to the winner.

Michael van Gerwen was the defending champion, having beaten Justin Pipe 6–0 in the final of the previous edition, and he retained his title by defeating Daryl Gurney 6–2 in the final.

Prize money
This is how the prize money is divided:

Qualification and format
The top 16 players from the PDC ProTour Order of Merit on 15 January automatically qualified for the event and were seeded in the second round. 

The remaining 32 places went to players from three qualifying events - 20 from the UK Qualifier (held in Wigan on 17 January), eight from the European Qualifier and four from the Host Nation Qualifier (both held on 23 January). 

The following players took part in the tournament:

Top 16
  Michael van Gerwen (winner)
  Michael Smith (third round)
  Peter Wright (third round)
  James Wade (third round)
  Kim Huybrechts (second round)
  Adrian Lewis (quarter-finals)
  Ian White (second round)
  Dave Chisnall (quarter-finals)
  Robert Thornton (withdrew)
  Jelle Klaasen (third round)
  Terry Jenkins (third round)
  Gary Anderson (second round)
  Benito van de Pas (quarter-finals)
  Brendan Dolan (second round)
  Mensur Suljović (semi-finals)
  Justin Pipe (third round)

UK Qualifier 
  Mervyn King (semi-finals)
  Simon Whitlock (quarter-finals)
  Stephen Bunting (second round)
  Ronnie Baxter (first round)
  Gerwyn Price (second round)
  Jamie Lewis (second round)
  Kevin Thomas (second round)
  John Henderson (second round)
  Daryl Gurney (runner-up)
  Mark Webster (second round)
  James Richardson (second round)
  Jamie Caven (first round)
  Paul Milford (first round)
  Ricky Evans (first round)
  David Pallett (first round)
  Ritchie Edhouse (third round)
  Robbie Green (first round)
  Kevin Painter (second round)
  Devon Petersen (third round)
  Ryan Harrington (second round)

European Qualifier
  Zoran Lerchbacher (first round)
  Jyhan Artut (first round)
  John Michael (first round)
  Mike De Decker (first round)
  Andree Welge (first round)
  Martin Schindler (first round)
  Dimitri Van den Bergh (first round)
  Rowby-John Rodriguez (second round)

Host Nation Qualifier
  Dirk van Duijvenbode (first round)
  Remco van Eijden (second round)
  Jermaine Wattimena (first round)
  Jan Dekker (first round)

Draw

References

2016 PDC European Tour
2016 in Dutch sport